Sherry Ball (born February 15, 1974) is a Canadian former pair skater.  With partner Kris Wirtz, she won the bronze medal at the 1992 Canadian Figure Skating Championships and competed in the Winter Olympics that year.

Results
pairs with Wirtz

References

1974 births
Canadian female pair skaters
Figure skaters at the 1992 Winter Olympics
Olympic figure skaters of Canada
People from St. Thomas, Ontario
Living people